Hylotelephium cauticola, the cliff stonecrop, syn. Sedum cauticola, is a species of flowering plant in the family Crassulaceae, native to Hokkaido, Japan.

The specific epithet cauticola means "growing on cliffs", referring to the plant's favoured habitat.

It is grown in rock gardens and alpine gardens in alkaline to neutral soil. It has gained the Royal Horticultural Society's Award of Garden Merit.

References

cauticola